Maschiaccio is a 1917 Italian film directed by Augusto Genina.

Cast
Oreste Bilancia   
Piera Bouvier   
Carlo Cattaneo   
Vasco Creti
Fernanda Negri Pouget   
Umberto Scalpellini   
Rosetta Solari

External links 
 

1917 films
Italian silent feature films
Films directed by Augusto Genina
Italian black-and-white films